Samad Seyidov Ismayil oglu (born on January 18, 1964) is a professor and an Azerbaijani politician who serves as the Member of National Assembly of Azerbaijan from the 36th Khatai electoral district.

Early life 
Seyidov was born on January 18, 1964, in Baku, Azerbaijan. He graduated from Psychology Studies Department of Saint Petersburg State University in Russia. Starting from 1986, he worked at Azerbaijan University of Languages as lab assistant, senior lab assistant, senior professor, vice-rector for education issues. In 2000, he was appointed Rector of the Azerbaijan University of Languages. He is member of International Association for Analytical Psychology As the rector of university he has established close ties with universities abroad.

Political career 
Seyidov was elected member of parliament during 2000 parliamentary elections to the National Assembly. He was re-elected from Khatai district of Baku on November 6, 2005, during the 2005 parliamentary elections. He was also elected Chairman of International and Interparliamentary Relations Committee of Azerbaijani Parliament. Seyidov also chairs Azerbaijan-US Interparliamentary Relations Working Group and is a member of Azerbaijan-Kazakhstan and Azerbaijan-Saudi Arabia interparliamentary working groups. He is member of New Azerbaijan Party.

Seyidov chairs the Azerbaijani delegation to Parliamentary Assembly of the Council of Europe (PACE) which consists of 12 members of parliament. He has been a member of the assembly since January 22, 2001. Seyidov is a member of Committee on Economic Affairs and Development, Committee on Migration, Refugees and Population, Committee on the Honouring of Obligations and Commitments by Member States of the Council of Europe (Monitoring Committee), Political Affairs Committee, Sub-Committee on conflict prevention through dialogue and reconciliation and Sub-Committee on External Relations. He currently acts as co-rapporteur of the Parliamentary Assembly of the Council of Europe (PACE) for the monitoring of Serbia,

Personal life
Samed Seyidov is fluent in English and Russian. He is married and has two children.

Awards 
 Legion of Honour, of the third degree (Chevalier) – 2011
 Medal "90th anniversary of the diplomatic service of the Republic of Azerbaijan (1919-2009)" – 2018
 Azerbaijan Democratic Republic 100th anniversary medal – 2019

References 

1964 births
Living people
Academic staff of the Azerbaijan University of Languages
Members of the National Assembly (Azerbaijan)
Politicians from Baku
Recipients of the Azerbaijan Democratic Republic 100th anniversary medal